Uruguay first participated at the Olympic Games in 1924, and has sent athletes to compete in every Summer Olympic Games since then, except when they boycotted the 1980 Summer Olympics.
It has participated in the Winter Olympic Games only once, in 1998.

Uruguayan athletes have won ten medals, with two gold medals in football.

Uruguay's National Olympic Committee was created in 1923, and recognized by the International Olympic Committee the same year.

Medal tables

Medals by Summer Games

Medals by Winter Games

Medals by sport

List of medalists

See also
 List of flag bearers for Uruguay at the Olympics
 :Category:Olympic competitors for Uruguay
 Uruguay at the Paralympics

External links